Computer-aided engineering (CAE) is the broad usage of computer software to aid in engineering analysis tasks. It is included with computer-aided design (CAD) and computer-aided manufacturing (CAM) in the collective abbreviation "CAx".

Overview 
Computer-aided engineering primarily uses computer-aided design (CAD) software, which are sometimes called CAE tools. CAE tools are used,  to analyze the robustness and performance of components and assemblies. CAE tools encompass simulation, validation, and optimization of products and manufacturing tools. CAE systems aim to be major providers of information to help support design teams in decision-making. Computer-aided engineering is used in various fields, like automotive, aviation, space, and shipbuilding industries.

CAE systems can provide support to businesses. This is achieved by the use of reference architectures and their ability to place information views on the business process. Reference architecture is the basis from which information is modeled, especially product and manufacturing models.

The term CAE has been used to describe the use of computer technology within engineering in a broader sense than just engineering analysis. It was in this context that the term was coined by Jason Lemon, founder of SDRC in the late 1970s. This definition is however better known today by the terms CAx and PLM.

CAE systems are individually considered a single node on a total information network and each node may interact with other nodes on the network.

CAE fields and phases 
CAE areas covered include:
Stress analysis on components and assemblies using finite element analysis (FEA);
Thermal and fluid flow analysis computational fluid dynamics (CFD);
Multibody dynamics (MBD) and kinematics;
Analysis tools for process simulation for operations such as casting, molding, and die press forming;
Optimization of the product or process.

In general, there are three phases in any computer-aided engineering task:
Pre-processing – defining the model and environmental factors to be applied to it (typically a finite element model, but facet, voxel, and thin sheet methods are also used);
Analysis solver (usually performed on high powered computers);
Post-processing of results (using visualization tools).

This cycle is iterated, often many times, either manually or with the use of commercial optimization software.

CAE in the automotive industry
CAE tools are widely used in the automotive industry. Their use has enabled automakers to reduce product development costs and time while improving the safety, comfort, and durability of the vehicles they produce. The predictive capability of CAE tools has progressed to the point where much of the design verification is done using computer simulations (diagnosis) rather than physical prototype testing. CAE dependability is based upon all proper assumptions as inputs and must identify critical inputs (BJ). Even though there have been many advances in CAE, and it is widely used in the engineering field, physical testing is still a must. It is used for verification and model updating, to accurately define loads and boundary conditions, and for final prototype sign-off.

The future of CAE in the product development process
Even though CAE has built a strong reputation as a verification, troubleshooting and analysis tool, there is still a perception that sufficiently accurate results come rather late in the design cycle to really drive the design. This can be expected to become a problem as modern products become ever more complex. They include smart systems, which leads to an increased need for multi-physics analysis including controls, and contain new lightweight materials, with which engineers are often less familiar. 
CAE software companies and manufacturers are constantly looking for tools and process improvements to change this situation. 

On the software side, they are constantly looking to develop more powerful solvers, to better utilize computer resources, and to include engineering knowledge in pre and post-processing. On the process side, they try to achieve a better alignment between 3D CAE, 1D system simulation, and physical testing. This should increase modeling realism and calculation speed. 

CAE software companies and manufacturers try to better integrate CAE in the overall product lifecycle management. In this way they can connect product design with product use, which is needed for smart products. This enhanced engineering process is also referred to as predictive engineering analytics.

See also

References

Further reading 

 B. Raphael and I.F.C. Smith (2003). Fundamentals of computer aided engineering. John Wiley. .

External links 

 Why do we need a CAE Software or Numerical Simulations?
 Computer Aided Engineering Journal WP:LINKROT (FEA, CAD, ...)
 Integrated Computer Aided Engineering Journal
 CAE AVI-gallery at CompMechLab site, Russia
 Computer-Aided Civil and Infrastructure Engineering
 Predictive engineering analytics

Computer-aided engineering software
 
Product lifecycle management
Engineering disciplines